In Greek mythology, Dias (Ancient Greek: Δίας) is a name shared by two individuals:
 Dias, according to one tradition, was the son of Pelops and Hippodamia, and the brother of Atreus, and the father of Cleolla. Most accounts have Agamemnon and Menelaus, as the sons of Atreus and Aerope. However according to the Byzantine scholar John Tzetzes (citing "Hesiod, Aeschylus, and some others"), Cleolla was, by her first cousin Pleisthenes (the son of Atreus and Aerope), the mother of Agamemnon, Menelaus and Anaxibia, while, according to the scholia to Euripides Orestes 4, she was married to her uncle Atreus, and was the mother by him of Pleisthenes who became the father of Agamemnon and Menelaus and Anaxibia (by Eriphyle).
 Dias, according to Stephanus of Byzantium, was the son of Abas the brother of Alcon and Arethusa and said to be the founder of the city of Athens in Euboea, naming it after his fatherland.

Notes

References 
 Fowler, R. L., Early Greek Mythography: Volume 2: Commentary, Oxford University Press, 2013. .
 Gantz, Timothy, Early Greek Myth: A Guide to Literary and Artistic Sources, Johns Hopkins University Press, 1996, Two volumes:  (Vol. 1),  (Vol. 2).
 Grimal, Pierre, The Dictionary of Classical Mythology, Wiley-Blackwell, 1996. .
 Hard, Robin, The Routledge Handbook of Greek Mythology: Based on H.J. Rose's "Handbook of Greek Mythology", Psychology Press, 2004, . Google Books.
 Most, G.W., Hesiod: The Shield, Catalogue of Women, Other Fragments, Loeb Classical Library, No. 503, Cambridge, Massachusetts, Harvard University Press, 2007, 2018. . Online version at Harvard University Press.
 Parada, Carlos, Genealogical Guide to Greek Mythology, Jonsered, Paul Åströms Förlag, 1993. .
 Smith, William, Dictionary of Greek and Roman Biography and Mythology, London (1873). Online version at the Perseus Digital Library.
 Stephanus of Byzantium, Stephani Byzantii Ethnicorum quae supersunt, edited by August Meineike (1790-1870), published 1849. A few entries from this important ancient handbook of place names have been translated by Brady Kiesling. Online version at the Topos Text Project.

Characters in Greek mythology
Elean mythology